Alias Grace is a Canadian television miniseries directed by Mary Harron and written by Sarah Polley, based on Margaret Atwood's 1996 novel of the same name. It stars Sarah Gadon, Edward Holcroft, Rebecca Liddiard, Zachary Levi, Kerr Logan, David Cronenberg, Paul Gross, and Anna Paquin. The series consists of six episodes. It premiered on CBC on September 25, 2017, and appeared on Netflix on November 3, 2017.

In advance of the series premiere, the first two episodes received a preview screening at the 2017 Toronto International Film Festival in its Primetime lineup of selected television programming.

The series was the third adaptation of an Atwood novel broadcast on television in 2017, after The Handmaid's Tale (adapted for Hulu) and Wandering Wenda (adapted for CBC Television's CBC Kids lineup).

Cast

Main
 Sarah Gadon as Grace Marks
 Edward Holcroft as Dr. Simon Jordan, a psychiatrist
 Rebecca Liddiard as Mary Whitney, Grace's friend
 Zachary Levi as Jeremiah the Peddler
 Kerr Logan as James McDermott, Kinnear's stableman
 David Cronenberg as Reverend Verrenger, a committee member who wants Grace acquitted
 Anna Paquin as Nancy Montgomery, Kinnear's housekeeper
 Paul Gross as Thomas Kinnear, a wealthy man who hires Grace

Recurring
 Martha Burns as Mrs. Parkinson
 Will Bowes as George Parkinson
 Sarah Manninen as Mrs. Humphrey
 Stephen Joffe as Jamie Walsh
 Michael Therriault as Mr. McDonald
 Margaret Atwood as Old Woman at Church (Cameo)

Episodes

Production
Public domain paintings from Statens Museum for Kunst (SMK - the national gallery of Denmark) decorate central locations in the series, among them the house of the Parkinson family where Grace Marks works as a maid, and the governor's mansion where she meets with Dr. Jordan. SMK provides free access to its public domain collection, and the scenographers have used a range of the museum's paintings, primarily from the 18th and 19th centuries.

The prison scenes were shot on location at Kingston Penitentiary in Kingston, Ontario where the real Grace Marks, who formed the basis of Atwood's character, was incarcerated. Scenes were also filmed at the Correctional Service of Canada Museum in the old Warden's residence.

Reception
On Metacritic, the series received a score of 81 out of 100 based on 30 reviews, indicating "universal acclaim". The miniseries has a 99% approval rating on Rotten Tomatoes, with an average rating of 8.00 out of 10 based on 82 reviews. The site's critical consensus is: "Biting social commentary and Sarah Gadon's hypnotic performance make Alias Grace a worthy addition to the Margaret Atwood adaptation catalog".

References

External links

 
 

 

2017 Canadian television series debuts
2017 Canadian television series endings
English-language Netflix original programming
Films based on works by Margaret Atwood
CBC Television original programming
Television shows based on Canadian novels
Murder in television
Television series set in the 1840s
Television series set in the 1850s
Television shows set in Toronto
Television shows filmed in Toronto
Television shows filmed in Kingston, Ontario
Irish-Canadian culture in Ontario
Gemini and Canadian Screen Award for Best Television Film or Miniseries winners
2010s Canadian drama television series
2010s Canadian television miniseries